The 2023 Navy Midshipmen football team will represent the United States Naval Academy in the 2023 NCAA Division I FBS football season. The Midshipmen play their home games at Navy–Marine Corps Memorial Stadium in Annapolis, Maryland, and compete in the American Athletic Conference (The American). They are led by first-year head coach Brian Newberry.

Previous season

The Midshipmen finished the 2022 season 4–8, 4–4 in American play to finish in seventh place in the Division.

Offseason

Coaching changes
On December 11, 2022, the Midshipmen fired Ken Niumatalolo after 15 years.

On December 19, 2022, the Midshipmen promoted Brian Newberry to be their next head coach. He had previously been the team's defensive coordinator.

On December 20, 2022, the Midshipmen promoted linebackers coach P. J. Volker to defensive coordinator and linebackers coach.

On January 5, 2023, the Midshipmen hired Grant Chesnut to be their offensive coordinator. He held the same position at Kennesaw State for the previous eight years.

On January 9, 2023, the Midshipmen hired Eric Lewis to be their safties coach and defensive pass game coordinator, they also added Brenten Wimberly as a defensive assistant.

Schedule
Navy and the American Athletic Conference (AAC) announced the 2023 football schedule on February 21, 2023.

References

Navy
Navy Midshipmen football seasons
Navy Midshipmen football